The 1991 FIVB Volleyball Men's Club World Championship was the 3rd edition of the event. It was held in São Paulo, Brazil from 22 to 27 October 1991.

Final standing

Awards
Most Valuable Player
 Karch Kiraly (il Messaggero Ravenna)

External links
Honours

1991 FIVB Men's Club World Championship
FIVB Men's Club World Championship
FIVB Men's Club World Championship
FIVB Volleyball Men's Club World Championship
International sports competitions in São Paulo